"The Rhyme" is the only single released from Keith Murray's second album, Enigma. The original version was again produced by Erick Sermon, with the remix produced by Jay Dee of The Ummah. "The Rhyme" made it to three Billboard charts, peaking at 12 on the Hot Rap Singles. The song contains samples from Run-D.M.C.'s "Sucker M.C.'s" and Maze's "Before I Let Go".

Music video

The official music video for the song was directed by Brian Luvar.

Single track listing
"The Rhyme" (LP Version)- 3:37
"The Rhyme" (Instrumental)- 3:38
"The Rhyme" (Slum Village Instrumental)- 4:01
"The Rhyme" (Slum Village Street Remix)- 4:01
"Yeah"- 4:52

Charts

References

1996 songs
1996 singles
Jive Records singles
Keith Murray (rapper) songs
Music videos directed by Brian Luvar
Song recordings produced by Erick Sermon
Songs written by Keith Murray (rapper)